In the mathematical discipline of graph theory, Shannon multigraphs, named after Claude Shannon by , are a special type of triangle graphs, which are used in the field of edge coloring in particular.

A Shannon multigraph is multigraph with 3 vertices for which either of the following conditions holds:
a) all 3 vertices are connected by the same number of edges.
b) as in a) and one additional edge is added.

This multigraph has maximum degree .

Examples

Edge coloring

When  is even, the example of the Shannon multigraph with multiplicity  shows that this bound is tight: the vertex degree is exactly , but each of the  edges is adjacent to every other edge, so it requires  colors in any proper edge coloring.

A version of Vizing's theorem  states that every multigraph with maximum degree  and multiplicity  may be colored using at most  colors. Again, this bound is tight for the Shannon multigraphs.

References

.
.
.
.

External links

Lutz Volkmann: Graphen an allen Ecken und Kanten. Lecture notes 2006, p. 242 (German)

Parametric families of graphs